ISO/IEC JTC 1/SC 31 Automatic identification and data capture techniques is a subcommittee of the International Organization for Standardization (ISO) and the International Electrotechnical Commission (IEC) Joint Technical Committee (JTC) 1, and was established in 1996. SC 31 develops and facilitates international standards, technical reports, and technical specifications in the field of automatic identification and data capture techniques. The first Plenary established three working groups (WGs): Data Carriers, Data Content, and Conformance.  Subsequent Plenaries established other working groups: RFID, RTLS, Mobile Item Identification and Management, Security and File Management, and Applications.

As of 2017, SC 31 has the following working groups:

·        WG 1: Data carrier

·        WG 2: Data and Structure

·        WG 4: Radio communications

·        WG 8: Application of AIDC standards

The international secretariat of ISO/IEC JTC 1/SC 31 is the American National Standards Institute (ANSI) located in the United States

Scope
The scope of ISO/IEC JTC 1/SC 31 is “Standardization of data formats, data syntax, data structures, data encoding, and technologies for the process of automatic identification and data capture and of associated devices utilized in inter-industry applications and international business interchanges and for mobile applications.”

Structure

ISO/IEC JTC 1/SC 31 is made up of, and four active working groups (WGs), each of which carries out specific tasks in standards development within the field of automatic identification and data capture techniques. Working groups can be disbanded if the group’s working area is no longer applicable to standardization needs, or established if new working areas arise. The focus of each working group is described in the group’s terms of reference. Active working groups of ISO/IEC JTC 1/SC 31 are:

Collaborations
ISO/IEC JTC 1/SC 31 works in close collaboration with a number of other organizations or subcommittees, both internal and external to ISO or IEC, in order to avoid conflicting or duplicative work. Organizations internal to ISO or IEC that collaborate with or are in liaison to ISO/IEC JTC 1/SC 31 include: 
 ISO/IEC JTC 1/SC 6, Telecommunications and information exchange between systems                                                                                                                                                              
 ISO/IEC JTC 1/SC 17, Cards and personal identification                                                                             
 ISO/IEC JTC 1/SC 17/WG 8, Integrated circuit cards without contacts                                                
 ISO/IEC JTC 1/SC 27, IT security techniques                                                                                        
 ISO/IEC JTC 1/SC 37, Biometrics                                                                                                            
 ISO/IEC JTC 1/SC 41, Internet of Things and related technologies                                                                                                  
 ISO/PC 246, Anti-counterfeiting tools                                                                                                   
 ISO/TC 104, Freight containers                                                                                                              
 ISO/TC 122, Packaging                                                                                                                          
 ISO/TC 184/SC 4, Industrial data                                                                                                            
 ISO/TC 204, Intelligent transportation system                                                                                   
 ISO/TC 247, Fraud countermeasures and controls

Some organizations external to ISO or IEC that collaborate with or are in liaison to ISO/IEC JTC 1/SC 31, include:
AIM Global Inc., Association for automatic identification and mobility                                    
CENELEC TC 106X, electromagnetic fields in the human environment                                       
CEN/TC 225, AIDC technologies                                                                                                                                            
CEN/TC 310, Advanced manufacturing technologies                                                                   
CEN/TC 331, Postal services                                                                                                                      
Ecma International                                                                                                                         
European Telecommunications Standards Institute (ETSI)                                                         
International Air Transport Association (IATA)                                                                                                                                     
Institute of Electrical and 
Electronics Engineers, (IEEE)                                                                                                                       
ITU                                                                                                                                                       
GS1, GS1 Global Office/EPC Global                                                                                            
Universal Postal Union (UPU)

Member countries
Countries pay a fee to ISO to be members of subcommittees. The 31 "P" (participating) members of ISO/IEC JTC 1/SC 31 are: Australia, Austria, Belgium, Brazil, Canada, China, Colombia, Czech Republic, Denmark, France, Germany, India, Ireland, Israel, Japan, Kenya, Republic of Korea, Malaysia, Netherlands, Peru, Philippines, Russian Federation, Singapore, Slovakia, South Africa, Spain, Sweden, Switzerland, United Kingdom, and United States.

The 12 "O" (observer) members of ISO/IEC JTC 1/SC 31 are: Bosnia and Herzegovina, Finland, Ghana, Hong Kong, Hungary, Indonesia, Islamic Republic of Iran, Italy, Kazakhstan, Luxembourg, New Zealand, Romania, Serbia, and Thailand.

Standards
ISO/IEC JTC 1/SC 31 currently has 107 published standards within the field of automatic identification and data capture, including:

Standards currently under development by ISO/IEC JTC 1/SC 31 include standards for Optical Character Recognition (OCR) by ISO/IEC JTC 1/SC W31/WG 1, standards for bar code symbols on mobile phone displays, and reading and display of ORM by mobile devices.

See also
 ISO/IEC JTC 1
 American National Standards Institute
 International Organization for Standardization
 International Electrotechnical Commission

References

External links 
 ISO/IEC JTC 1/SC 31 page at ISO

031